Shavim (Hebrew: שווים) is an album by Israeli singers Ran Danker and Ilai Botner. It became number one in Israel with 'Bo’i Nazov'" being voted Israel's song of the year in 2007. The album includes the song Ani Esh ("I am a fire").

Tracklist
 יום הולדת 2:40
 4:10 בואי נעזוב
 3:14 הכל מזכיר אותך
 3:51 מי בחלומך
שווים   3:52
 3:27 אני אש
 2:21 לחזור לישון ביחד
 3:19 נעימה
 2:44 מחכה לך
 4:00 מה שלא הספקתי לומר
 3:22 12 שנים
 3:07 במקום לבכות

References

2007 albums
Pop albums by Israeli artists